The 1994–95 Miami Redskins men's basketball team represent Miami University in the 1994–95 NCAA Division I men's basketball season. The Redskins, led by second-year head coach Herb Sendek, played their home games at Millett Hall in Oxford, Ohio as members of the Mid-American Conference. The team finished atop the conference regular season standings, won the MAC tournament, and earned an automatic bid to the NCAA tournament. As the No. 12 seed in the Midwest region, Miami upset No. 5 seed Arizona in the opening round before losing to No. 4 seed Virginia in the round of 32. The Redskins finished with a 23–7 record (16–2 MAC).

Roster

Schedule and results

|-
!colspan=9 style=| Regular season

|-
!colspan=9 style=| MAC tournament

|-
!colspan=9 style=| NCAA tournament

Source

Rankings

References

Miami RedHawks men's basketball seasons
Miami (OH)
Miami (OH)